

Hans Kroh (13 May 1907 – 18 July 1967) was a German paratroop general in the Wehrmacht and Bundeswehr and a recipient of the Knight's Cross of the Iron Cross with Oak Leaves and Swords of Nazi Germany.

Kroh started his military career in 1935; he transferred to the Luftwaffe in 1936. He took part in the Battle of Crete for which he received the Knight's Cross of the Iron Cross on 21 August 1941. In Africa Kroh served in the Ramcke Parachute Brigade. Kroh commanded the 2nd Parachute Division in the Battle for Brest; he was taken prisoner on 18 September 1944. Kroh joined the Bundeswehr in 1956 as Oberst. In 1957 he was promoted to Brigadegeneral and appointed a divisional commander. He retired in 1962 at the rank of Generalmajor. Kroh died in 1967.

Awards
 Iron Cross 2nd Class (22 May 1940) & 1st Class (22 May 1940)
 Medaglia d'Argento al Valor Militare (9 February 1942)
 German Cross in Gold on 24 December 1942 as Major in the I./Lw.Jg.Brig. 1
 Knight's Cross of the Iron Cross with Oak Leaves and Swords
 Knight's Cross on 21 August 1941 as Major and commander I./Fallschirmjäger-Regiment 2
 443rd Oak Leaves on 6 April 1944 as Oberstleutnant and commander of the Fallschirmjäger-Regiment 2
 96th Schwerter on 12 September 1944 as Oberst and leader of the 2. Fallschirmjäger-Division
 Great Cross of Merit (12 September 1962)

References

Citations

Bibliography

 
 
 
 

1907 births
1967 deaths
Military personnel from Heidelberg
People from the Grand Duchy of Baden
Fallschirmjäger of World War II
Bundeswehr generals
Recipients of the Gold German Cross
Recipients of the Knight's Cross of the Iron Cross with Oak Leaves and Swords
Recipients of the Silver Medal of Military Valor
Commanders Crosses of the Order of Merit of the Federal Republic of Germany
Major generals of the Luftwaffe
Luftwaffe World War II generals
Major generals of the German Army